Miss Thailand World is a national pageant in which the winners compete in the Miss World, one of the Big Four major international beauty pageants. 

The reigning Miss Thailand World is Narintorn Chadapattarawalrachoat of Pathum Thani. She represent Thailand at Miss World 2019 in London where she ended up in the Top 40.

History
In 1985, BEC-Tero Entertainment Pcl. (Channel 3) was awarded the rights to host the Miss Thailand World pageant and to send a Thai representative to compete at Miss World. Parnlekha Wanmuang was crowned the first Miss Thailand World in 1985.

Titleholders

Winners by province

Gallery of winners

Miss Thailand World representatives at International beauty pageants 
Color keys

Miss World

Miss Chinese International

Past Franchises 
Color keys

Miss Supranational

Miss Intercontinental

Supermodel International

World Supermodel

Miss Asia Pageant

Miss Asia Pacific World

Maja International

See also

References

External links
 

Thailand
Beauty pageants in Thailand
Miss Thailand World